Creagra is a genus of moths in the subfamily Lymantriinae. The genus was described by Wallengren in 1865.

Species
Creagra comorensis Collenette, 1937 Grande Comoro
Creagra liturata (Guérin-Méneville, [1844]) southern Africa

References

Lymantriinae